SDV may stand for:

 Swimmer delivery vehicle for scuba divers
 SEAL Delivery Vehicle
 Shut down valve
 Switched digital video via cable
 Sde Dov Airport, Tel Aviv, Israel (by IATA airport code)
 Society of Divine Vocations or Vocationist Fathers
 SDV International Logistics
 Source Data Verification, for clinical trials